Aktau International Airport , formerly Shevchenko-Central, is an international airport in Mangystau Region, Kazakhstan. It is the primary international airport serving Aktau. The airport is the eighth-busiest international air passenger gateway into Central Asia, the 50th-busiest airport in the Post-Soviet states, the fourth-busiest airport in  Kazakhstan.

The airport features one passenger terminal and one runway. It serves as a focus city for SCAT Airlines. The airport is served year-round by Aeroflot, Air Astana, SCAT Airlines, Qazaq Air and on a seasonal basis by Belavia and Sunday Airlines. 

Overview
In November 1996 the joint stock company Aktau International Airport was established. The development of the oil industry in the Caspian region required an increase in freight volumes and a rapid delivery of necessary equipment for the oil industry. This, in turn, led to the need for reconstruction of the airfield and an increase in passenger capacity at the terminal.

Usage

With 1 million passengers passing through in 2018, the airport was the third busiest in Kazakhstan, after Almaty Airport and Astana Airport, and was the 50th-busiest airport in the Post-Soviet states.

Operations
Aktau International Airport is used by 6 airlines flying to 14 destinations in 4 countries. The airport is the primary hub of SCAT Airlines. It has one passenger terminal. In 2018, it served 1 023 900 passengers, making it the third-busiest airport in Kazakhstan. The busiest single destination in passenger numbers is Atyrau. The airport is able to accommodate jets the size of the AN-124, Boeing 747, Il-76 and lighter, as well as helicopters of all types. However, smaller jets like the Airbus A319, Boeing 737 and CRJ-200 are more commonly seen there.

In 2007, the airport was given a concession period of 30 years to the ATM Group. The contract includes construction of a new passenger terminal. The new terminal was completed in 2009.

The terminal is equipped with electronic and electromechanical systems. These include passenger telescopic ladders, racks of electronic registration, HVAC (heating and cooling system), FIDS (Alert System departures on the electronic scoreboard), X-ray scanners, CCTV, lifts and escalators.

SCAT Airlines is based in Aktau and operates flights to Baku, Tbilisi, Moscow and various other Russian cities. Air Astana operates daily flights to Atyrau, Almaty and Nur-Sultan. There are also flights operated by Aeroflot to Moscow.

Airlines and destinations

Passenger

The following airlines operate regular scheduled and charter services to and from Aktau:

Cargo

Statistics

Passenger figures

See also
 Transport in Kazakhstan
 List of airports in Kazakhstan
 List of the busiest airports in the former USSR

References

Airports in Kazakhstan
Airport